Youth Takes a Fling is a 1938 American comedy film directed by Archie Mayo and starring Joel McCrea.

McCrea plays Joe Meadows, whose only ambition as a Kansas farm boy was a life at sea.  He moves to New York to try to get a job as a sailor, finds it more difficult than he thought, and meets Helen Brown, who falls for him and uses her feminine wiles to try to prevent him leaving.

One of Leeds relatively few films, both she and McCrea were loaned to Universal from Samuel Goldwyn.

Cast 
 Joel McCrea as Joe Meadows
 Andrea Leeds as Helen Brown
 Frank Jenks as Frank Munson
 Dorothea Kent as Jean
 Isabel Jeans as Mrs. Merrivale
 Virginia Grey as Madge
 Grant Mitchell as Duke
 Henry Mollison as Dunham
 Brandon Tynan as Tad
 Oscar O'Shea as Captain Walters
 Granville Bates as Mr. Judd
 Roger Davis as Floorwalker
 Marion Martin as Girl on Beach
 Olaf Hytten as Dunham's Butler
 Willie Best as George
 Catherine Proctor as Mrs. Aspitt
 Yvonne Boisseau as Miss Beaton
 Arthur Housman as First Communist
 John Sheehan as Second Communist
 Chester Clute as Salesman
 Wade Boteler as Tugboat Captain
 Tom Dugan as Bum
 Eddie Acuff as Bum

References

External links 
 
 

1938 films
Films directed by Archie Mayo
Films produced by Joe Pasternak
American black-and-white films
American comedy films
1938 comedy films
Universal Pictures films
1930s American films
1930s English-language films